Delias splendida is a butterfly in the family Pieridae. It was described by Walter Rothschild in 1894. It is endemic to Timor.

The wingspan is about 83 mm.

References

External links
Delias at Markku Savela's Lepidoptera and Some Other Life Forms

splendida
Butterflies described in 1894